The Grosvenor UK Poker Tour  is a major series of regional poker tournaments held across the United Kingdom run by Grosvenor Casinos, a UK based casino chain operated by The Rank Group. The Grosvenor UK Poker Tour was established in 2007, returning for subsequent seasons in 2008, 2009, 2010, 2011, 2012, 2013, 2014 and 2015.

The 2012 season was to see the GUKPT host an event abroad for the first time. A tournament was scheduled to take place in Dublin, Ireland but was later cancelled. A new tournament was arranged in Blankenberge, Belgium though it only managed to attract 95 entrants. Subsequent seasons have not featured tournaments outside the United Kingdom.

Tournament results

2007 Tour

2008 Tour

2009 Tour

2010 Tour

2011 Tour

2012 Tour

2013 Tour

2014 Tour

2015 Tour

References

External links
 Grosvenor UK Poker Tour official website
 Grosvenor UK Poker Tour at the Hendon Mob powered by the Global Poker Index

Poker tournaments in Europe